Outland is the seventh studio album by English Electronic musician Ital Tek. It was released on 1 May 2020 under Planet Mu.

Release 
On 5 March 2020, the first single "Deadhead" was released. The second single "Leaving the Grid" was released on 17 April 2020.

Track listing

References 

2020 albums
Planet Mu albums